Chrystian, artistic name of José Pereira da Silva Neto (3 November 1956) is a Brazilian singer of the sertanejo genre. With his brother Ralf, he was part of the duo Chrystian & Ralf.

Don't Say Goodbye

In 1973, the first Chrystian's hit was "Don't Say Goodbye". The song spent 19 weeks at number 1 on the charts. But despite the huge success, Chrystian still faced financial difficulties.

Obliged to sing in English due to the fad of the record companies, at first he appeared almost as a "ghost" singer, since on the cover of his debut album, instead of his own photo, there was the face of a model. He also couldn't appear on television so they wouldn't know he was a Brazilian singer. At that time, his main songs were:

 "Don't Say Goodbye" 
 "Tears"
 "More Than You Know" 
 "Everywhere" 
 "Lies" 
 "Emotions In My Heart"
 "Shadows"

Chrystian & Ralf duo

In the early 1980s, Chrystian and Ralf finally decided to record country music. In December 1999, they announced the separation, which greatly shook fans and the artistic environment. In 2000, Chrystian released the CD "Beijo Final", on the BMG label, which circulated for two years. In the same year, he participated in the vocals of the composition "Tarde Demais" on the CD by Zezé Di Camargo & Luciano. Only in May 2001, the duo returned to form a partnership. In 2007, nine years after their first acoustic work, the duo released "Acústico 2". The album that hit the market on SMD and SMDV is Power Records' first release in that format.

Solo career

At the end of 2021, Chrystian announced that he would pursue a solo career for the next 5 years. His first tour is called "Romance".

Personal life

Chrystian has admitted to having dyslexia, a learning disorder characterized by difficulty reading.

In 1981, he married singer Gretchen. The relationship came to an end after a few months because of the singer's betrayals, which was involved with some chacretes, according to her

Discography

Albums

 1973 – Don't Say Goodbye
 1976 – Made In USA
 2000 – Beijo Final

Singles and EPs

 1973 – Don't Say Goodbye
 1973 – No Broken Heart, So Don't Try
 1973 – For Better
 1973 – Don't Say Goodbye/Try/For Better/Question Mark
 1974 – Tears/Love Me More and More
 1975 – More Than You Know/Swingin'
 1975 – Shadows/My Life
 1975 – Lagrimas/Quiereme Mas
 1977 – You´re So Tender/Secrets in Your Eyes/Love´s a Dream/Fly/
 1977 –  Love Song/Tears
 1978 – Bird Songs/She´s My World
 1978 – Diana Ross & The Supremes / Chrystian / Charo & The Salsoul Orchestra / Michael Jackson – Pro Som and Top Tape- Pro Som e Top Tape
 1979 – Lies/Sky Fly
 1980 – Emotions In My Heart/Never Thought I'd Say Goodbye
 1981 – Sorrows/Everywhere
.1982 – Good Old (Fashioned Rock'n Roll) / Things

Compilations

 1983 – Chrystian – 10 Anos Depois

References

External Links

 
 Chrystian Discogs 

1956 births
People from Goiânia
Living people
English-language singers from Brazil
Sertanejo musicians